Mesalina bahaeldini is a species of lizard in the family Lacertidae. The species is endemic to Egypt.

Etymology
The specific name, bahaeldini, is in honor of Egyptian zoologist Sherif M. Baha El Din, who is the husband of the late American-born herpetologist Mindy Baha El Din.

Habitat
The natural habitat of M. bahaeldini is rocky areas.

Reproduction
M. bahaeldini is oviparous.

Conservation status
M. bahaeldini is threatened by habitat loss.

Subspecies
Two subspecies are recognized as being valid, including the nominotypical subspecies.
Mesalina bahaeldini bahaeldini 
Mesalina bahaeldini curatorum

References

Further reading
Segoli M, Cohen T, Werner YL (2002). "A new lizard of the genus Mesalina from Mt. Sinai, Egypt (Reptilia: Squamata: Sauria: Lacertidae)". Faunistiche Abhandlungen Staatliches Museum für Tierkunde Dresden 23 (9): 157–176. (Mesalina bahaeldini, new species, pp. 169–172).
Sindaco R, Jeremčenko VK (2008). The Reptiles of the Western Palearctic: 1. Annotated Checklist and Distributional Atlas of the Turtles, Crocodiles, Amphisbaenians and Lizards of Europe, North Africa, Middle East and Central Asia. Latina, Italy: Edizioni Belvedere. 580 pp. .
Werner YL, Ashkenazi S (2010). "Notes on some Egyptian Lacertidae, including a new subspecies of Mesalina, involving the Seligmann effect". Turkish Journal of Zoology 34: 123–133. (Mesalina bahaeldini curatorum, new subspecies).

Mesalina
Endemic fauna of Egypt
Vertebrates of Egypt
Lizards of Africa
Reptiles described in 2002
Taxa named by Michal Segoli
Taxa named by Tzahala Cohen
Taxa named by Yehudah L. Werner
Taxonomy articles created by Polbot